Bruce Millar Forrester (December 26, 1908 – January 30, 1995) was a judge of the United States Tax Court.

He was born in Kansas City, Missouri, and graduated from Pembroke Country-Day School in 1928. He earned his undergraduate degree from the University of Missouri, and then a law degree from the University of Missouri School of Law. Thereafter, he went into private practice in Kansas City and eventually became a partner in a law firm.

On April 24, 1957, President Dwight D. Eisenhower appointed Forrester to a seat on the United States Tax Court. He was confirmed by the United States Senate, and served actively until assuming senior status in 1978. He continued as a senior judge until 1984, when he retired.  He had served on the bench for 27 years.

Forrester died in his home in Chevy Chase, Maryland, from dysplastic anemia, and was survived by his wife of 57 years, Anne Lee Broaddus Forrester, and three children.

References

Sources
"President Names 2 for Tax Court", The New York Times, April 24, 1957.

"B.M. Forrester, U.S. Tax Judge, Dies At Age 86," The Washington Post, February 2, 1995.

1908 births
1995 deaths
Judges of the United States Tax Court
United States Article I federal judges appointed by Dwight D. Eisenhower
20th-century American judges
People from Chevy Chase, Maryland
Lawyers from Kansas City, Missouri
University of Missouri School of Law alumni
University of Missouri alumni